Cermak may refer to:

Chicago CTA stations
54th/Cermak (CTA station), a Chicago Transit Authority Pink Line station
Cermak–Chinatown (CTA station), a Chicago Transit Authority Red Line station
Cermak–McCormick Place (CTA station), a Chicago Transit Authority Green Line station

Other
 Anton Cermak, 34th mayor of Chicago.
Cermak Road, an east–west road in Chicago's Near South Side
Čermák (surname)